Louis Bernard Stringer (May 13, 1917 – October 19, 2008) was an American second baseman in Major League Baseball who played for the Chicago Cubs and Boston Red Sox between the  and  seasons. He was born in Grand Rapids, Michigan, and raised in East Los Angeles, California.

Biography
Stringer was one of many major leaguers who saw his baseball career interrupted by World War II. In his case, he served a stint in the United States Army Air Forces and missed three seasons (1943–1945).

He entered the Majors with the Cubs, playing for them three years (1941–42, 1946) before joining the Red Sox (1948–50). His most productive season came in his rookie year, when he posted career-numbers in games (145), hits (126), runs (59), extra bases (40) and runs batted in (53), while hitting .246 with a .324 on-base percentage. In 1942 he hit .241 with 41 RBI and a career-high nine home runs in 121 games. Injuries shortened his career after that, being replaced by Don Johnson in the Cubs infield. He also appeared in 63 games in parts of three seasons for the Red Sox.

In a six-season career, Stringer was a .242 hitter (290–for–1,196) with 19 home runs and 122 RBI in 409 games, including 148 runs, 49 doubles, 10 triples and seven stolen bases.

Stringer's minor league baseball career lasted for all or parts of 13 years between 1937 and 1957, and included a brief stint as acting manager of the Hollywood Stars of the Pacific Coast League in 1948. He died in Lake Forest, California, at the age of  91.

References

External links
Baseball Reference
Retrosheet
Baseball in Wartime

Obituary at OC Register

1917 births
2008 deaths
United States Army Air Forces personnel of World War II
Baseball players from Los Angeles
Baseball players from Grand Rapids, Michigan
Boise Braves players
Boston Red Sox players
Chicago Cubs players
Des Moines Bruins players
Hollywood Stars managers
Hollywood Stars players
Los Angeles Angels (minor league) players
Major League Baseball second basemen
Pocatello Bannocks players
Ponca City Angels players
San Diego Padres (minor league) players
San Francisco Seals (baseball) players
Yakima Bears players
People from East Los Angeles, California